Kinrara is a volcano in Queensland, Australia. It is one of the youngest volcanoes in Australia, and erupted 7,000 years ago (± 2000 years).

Eruption

Lavas flowed 55 km from the crater, and cover 173 km2. According to one study, the Gugu-Badhun people have oral traditions that may describe the volcano erupting, equivalent to around 230 ± 70 generations ago.

Geography
Wetlands at the Valley of Lagoons occur around the boundary between the Kinrara flow and the Burdekin River.

See also  
List of volcanoes in Australia

References 

Volcanoes of Queensland